The Albino's Dancer is the ninth in the series of "Time Hunter" novellas, and features the characters Honoré Lechasseur and Emily Blandish from Daniel O'Mahony's Doctor Who novella The Cabinet of Light. It is written by Dale Smith, author of the BBC Books Past Doctor Adventure Heritage.

The novella is also available in a limited edition hardback, signed by the author

The series is not formally connected to the Whoniverse.

It has been suggested that the Ninth Doctor makes a brief cameo in the novella, although Smith has neither confirmed nor denied it.

Synopsis
An encounter with the mysterious Catherine Howkins warns Honoré Lechasseur that Emily Blandish is about to die. However, even with this knowledge, can he prevent her death? At the same time, the Albino, a gangster operating in post-rationing London, has also taken an interest in Emily.

Background
Smith created the character of the Albino prior to The Albino's Dancer in a Doctor Who short story, "Virgo the Virgin", which was submitted for the Big Finish Productions anthology Short Trips: Zodiac but ultimately rejected. It is available on Smith's webpage together with an introduction for the novella in the style of the introductions for the Telos Doctor Who novellas and a missing chapter from the novella hidden as an Easter egg.

Smith's previous novel was dedicated to "Cathy Howkins", the same name as the main character of the novella.

In a downloadable interview, Smith has suggested that the novella bears some similarity to The Time Traveller's Wife, although he states he had not read the book before writing the novella.

References

External links
 Telos Publishing - The Albino's Dancer
Sci-Fi Online Review

2006 British novels
2006 science fiction novels
British science fiction novels
Novels by Dale Smith
Time Hunter
Albinism in popular culture
Doctor Who novellas
Telos Publishing books